The Lithuania national badminton team represents Lithuania in international badminton team competitions. The team is managed by the Lithuanian Badminton Federation. Lithuania competed in the 1989 Sudirman Cup as part of the Soviet Union. 

In the European championships, the Lithuanian men's and women's teams debuted in the 2008 European Men's and Women's Team Badminton Championships. Lithuania won its first badminton medal in the European Games when four-time national champion, Kęstutis Navickas defeated Yuhan Tan of Belgium to earn a place in the men's singles semifinal.

Participation in BWF competitions

Sudirman Cup

Participation in European Team Badminton Championships

Men's Team

Women's Team

Mixed Team

Participation in European Junior Team Badminton Championships
Mixed Team

Current squad 
The following players were selected to represent Lithuania at the 2020 European Men's and Women's Team Badminton Championships.

Male players
Mark Sames
Jonas Petkus
Ignas Reznikas
Danielius Berzanskis
Edgaras Slusnys

Female players
Gerda Voitechovskaja
Rebeka Alekseviciute
Vytaute Fomkinaite
Samanta Golubickaite
Gabija Mockute

References

Badminton
National badminton teams
Badminton in Lithuania